Jamia Darul-uloom Siddiqia is an Islamic seminary located in the North Karachi area of Karachi, Pakistan. It is considered as one of the most successful Islamic seminary which is dealing in traditional studies of the Quran, Sunnah and Fiqha with modern techniques.

Renowned  orthodox Hanafi Cleric Molana Mashkoor Hashmi is the founder and Principal of this seminary. About 1000 students are getting there Islamic and modern education and availing free hostel facilities in the seminary.

Foundation 
Jamia Darululoom Siddiqia was founded on 12 February 1990 by a cleric Molana Mashkoor Hashmi. He chose the name "Siddiqia" for this newly established seminary on the name of his beloved teacher and renowned orthodox diobandi Cleric of subcontinent Molana Siddiq Ahmed Bandvi(r) late.

Affiliation 

Jamia Darululoom Siddiqia is a prominent institute of Ahl-e-Sunnat Wel Jamat. All the teachers and the students of this institute are cordially affiliated with the doctrine of revolutionary deobandi movement of Indian sabcontinant.

Jamia Darululoom Siddiqia is formally allied with the local board of Islamic seminaries, Wifaq ul Madaris Al Arabia Pakistan, which is the largest board of Islamic Seminaries all around the world. Therefore, Jamia Daruloom Siddiqia relied on Wifaq ul Madris to make all the arrangements for conducting annual examination at all the levels.

Administration of Jamia is also taking significant steps to be affiliated with the Boards of Secondary Education and the Board of Higher Secondary Education, Karachi.

Significants 
Jamia Darululoom Siddiqia is included in some of those Islamic seminaries where modern and mainstream education, (from school to the college level) are also given with traditional Darse-Nizam course of The Quran, Hadees and Fiqah.
About 1000 students are getting there education in the seminary and availing free hostel facilities. In spite of these all services, Jamia Siddiqia does not charge any fees from the students and all the expenditures are managed through donations..=

Departments 
Jamia Darululoom Siddiqia has the following nine different departments.
Department of Nazra and Hifz
Department of Darse-Nizami
Department of Banat (Girls Campus)
Department of Mastoraat (Adult Woman Campus)
Department of Fehme-Deen (Adult Men Campus)
Department of English and Arabi
Computer Lab
Library
Science Libertarian

Pictures

References

External links
 Jamia Siddiqia's Official Website
 Wifaqul Madaris Al Arabia

Islamic political organizations
Deobandi Islamic universities and colleges
Educational organisations based in Pakistan
Madrasas in Pakistan